JBL is an American audio electronics company.

JBL may refer also to:

People
J. B. L. Reyes (1902–1994), Filipino jurist
JBL, ring name of John Layfield (John "Bradshaw" Layfield; born 1966), American professional wrestler

Other uses
Deportivo JBL del Zulia, a football club based in Maracaibo, Venezuela
Japan Basketball League
Journal of Biblical Literature
The ticker symbol of Jabil